Night School is a play by Harold Pinter presented on television in 1960. It was first published in 1961. The plot focuses on a man returning home from prison to find his room being rented out to a tenant. As customary with most of Pinter's works, the play features many aspects of Comedy of menace.

Original production
Associated-Rediffusion broadcast the play on 21 July 1960, in a production by Joan Kemp-Welch, for the ITV Television Playhouse series.   

Cast
Sally - Vivien Merchant
Walter	- Milo O'Shea
Solto	- Martin Miller
Under Manager	- Nicholas Stuart
Manager - Bernard Spear
Annie	- Jane Eccles
Milly	- Iris Vandeleur
Hostess - Mavis Traill
Cast member - Barbara Ferris
Cast member- Carol Austin

Radio adaptation
The BBC Third Programme broadcast the play on 25 September 1966, in a production by Guy Vaesen. 
 
Cast (in order of speaking)
Annie - Mary O'Farrell
Walter - John Hollis
Milly - Sylvia Coleridge
Sally - Prunella Scales
Solto - Sydney Tafler
Tully - Preston Lockwood
Barbara - Barbara Mitchell
Mavis - Carol Marsh

References

External links

1960 plays
1960 television plays